ortho-Methylphenylpiperazine (also known as oMPP, oMePP, 1-(2-methylphenyl)piperazine, 2-MPP, and 2-MePP) is a psychoactive designer drug of the phenylpiperazine group. It acts as a serotonin–norepinephrine–dopamine releasing agent (SNDRA), with EC50 values for induction of monoamine release of 175 nM for serotonin, 39.1 nM for norepinephrine, and 296–542 nM for dopamine. As such, it has about 4.5-fold preference for induction of norepinephrine release over serotonin, and about 7.6- to 13.9-fold preference for induction of norepinephrine release over dopamine.

The 2,3-methyl and 4-methyl analogues show diminished activity as dopamine releasing agents with respective EC50 values of 1,207 nM and 9,523 nM. However, at the same time, induction of serotonin and norepinephrine release is retained and more balanced in the 2,3-methyl analogue, with respective EC50 values of 26 nM and 56 nM.

See also
 Substituted piperazine

References

Designer drugs
Phenylpiperazines
Serotonin-norepinephrine-dopamine releasing agents
Stimulants